Series 7 of the ITV programme Foyle's War first aired in 2013, beginning Sunday 24 March; comprising three episodes, it is set in the period from August–September 1946.

Episodes

"The Eternity Ring"

Cast and characters
Foyle returns from a trip to the US, during which he pursued former industrialist and subsequently senator Howard Paige ("Fifty Ships"). It is revealed that Paige committed suicide, allegedly after being hounded by Foyle, although Foyle was unaware of Paige's suicide. The episode reintroduces the recurring character Hilda Pierce, played by Ellie Haddington ("War Games", "The French Drop" and "All Clear"), turning her into a regular MI5 character and Foyle as one of her operatives. It also introduces the regular character of Arthur Valentine, another MI5 operative played by Tim McMullan.

The episode also reintroduces Adam Wainwright, now Stewart's husband, as a Labour candidate in a forthcoming parliamentary by-election, though he is played by a new actor (Daniel Weyman, as opposed to Max Brown). Another character is Sergeant Frank Shaw, a former constable and POW, who struggles as he returns from Singapore to a family and reality that has changed and evolved in the six years he was absent.

Background and production
The episode begins with the 16 July 1945 Trinity nuclear test in New Mexico, USA, and is framed within the rising mistrust of the developing Cold War between the West and the Soviets. The main nuclear scientists portrayed in the episode, Dr. Max Hoffman and Prof. Michael Fraser, are loosely based on John von Neumann and Klaus Fuchs, respectively.

"The Cage"

Cast and characters
Adam Wainwright, with the support of Sam Wainwright, is successful in his bid to win the Peckham by-election as a Labour Party candidate.

Background and production
Much of this story is loosely based on the real "Tin Eye", Lieutenant Colonel Robin Stephens, who ran Camp 020, an interrogation centre near London during the Second World War. References are also made in the episode to ongoing housing and food shortages, food rationing, the Lend-Lease programme and abuses of the Official Secrets Act. Women's multi-style coupon buster shoes, fashionable at the time, also serve as a plot point as does Dr Ian Ross' tick-borne tropical disease research.

"Sunflower"

Cast and characters
Foyle's personal life is not expanded in this episode, apart from his increasing work collaboration with Valentine. Much of the character focus in the episodes of this series centres on the developing personal lives of Sam Wainwright, news of her pregnancy, and the evolving political career of her husband. Adam Wainwright, now a PPS, also deals with a politically influenced land valuation, which he exposes, leading to the resignation of his minister from parliament.

Background and production
The film is based around the fictionalised events of a massacre of 26 US soldiers known as "Operation Sonnenblume (Sunflower)", although in fact the actual Operation Sonnenblume happened in North Africa in 1941. In August 1944, Mortain - the village with the sunflower farm referred to in the episode - was an important battle site within the wider Normandy Campaign and the eventual allied successes in the Falaise Pocket, but the incident bears similarity with the later Malmedy massacre in Belgium. In the show, the Americans also attempt to pressure MI5 into handing over Strasser by threatening the 1943 BRUSA Agreement and loan terms that the US has extended to the UK.

International broadcast
Series Seven was broadcast in the United States on PBS stations on Masterpiece Mystery! as Foyle's War VII on 15, 22 and 29 September 2013, and on Netflix as of April 2014.

References

External links 
Series 7 on IMDb

Fiction set in 1946
Foyle's War episodes
2013 British television seasons